The women's 400 metres event at the 2000 World Junior Championships in Athletics was held in Santiago, Chile, at Estadio Nacional Julio Martínez Prádanos on 17, 18 and 20 October.

Medalists

Results

Final
20 October

Semifinals
18 October

Semifinal 1

Semifinal 2

Heats
17 October

Heat 1

Heat 2

Heat 3

Heat 4

Participation
According to an unofficial count, 26 athletes from 18 countries participated in the event.

References

400 metres
400 metres at the World Athletics U20 Championships